War in Abkhazia may refer to:
War in Abkhazia (1992–1993)
War in Abkhazia (1998)